The Julian T. Ricketts House is a historic house built with lava rock in Jerome, Idaho.

Description and history 
Julian Ricketts homesteaded the property in 1911 and in 1927 began plans for the lava rock home with his wife, enlisting carpenter Maurice Wullf who in turn had plans drawn up by a professional at the Payette Lumber Company of Boise, Idaho. Master stonemason H.T. Pugh built the lower story of locally sourced stone. It was listed on the National Register of Historic Places on September 8, 1983, as part of the Lava Rock Structures in South Central Idaho Thematic Resource.

See also
 Homestead Acts
 National Register of Historic Places listings in Jerome County, Idaho

References

External links
 * 

1928 establishments in Idaho
Houses completed in 1928
Houses in Jerome County, Idaho
Houses on the National Register of Historic Places in Idaho
National Register of Historic Places in Jerome County, Idaho